"Wanna Get Up" is a 1998 song recorded by Belgian/Dutch Eurodance band 2 Unlimited. It was released as the debut single from the band to feature Romy van Oojen and Marjon van Iwaarden as the lead vocalists. It was also the lead single from 2 Unlimited's fourth studio album, II. Romy and Marjon were picked out of 150 candidates at various auditions in Holland, Belgium and the United Kingdom.

In an interview with Music & Media, producer De Coster commented on the song: "With the raps deleted, the songs have a more conventional 'verse-chorus-bridge' pop structure. We wanted radio to get on board at once. These days it's much harder to cross over from the clubs to radio than it was seven years ago when we started. Radio and clubs lead separate lives now." Dutch music television channel TMF made the music video of "Wanna Get Up" a "Superclip", the station's highest rotation with 60 plays a week.

Release and reception
The release scored chart success in some European countries, most notably peaking at number 7 in Belgium, number 10 in the Netherlands and number 16 in Finland. "Wanna Get Up" was the only single with the new vocalists to ever chart in the UK, where it debuted at number 38. On the Eurochart Hot 100, the song reached number 27. In Canada, the single peaked at number-one on the dance music chart. The single was originally promoted as a white label with just a II sticker on it.

BBC Radio 1 DJ Judge Jules liked the track so much that he played it for four weeks in a row on his show. When he found out that it was a 2 Unlimited single, he no longer supported the track.

The single came in two versions: the original pop version, which was markedly different from the band's previous eurodance sound; and a remix by German DJ Sash!. It was the Sash! version that was promoted as the main single in the UK.

Music video
The music video for "Wanna Get Up" was directed by Jan Russel.

Track listing

Charts

Weekly charts

Year-end charts

References

1998 singles
2 Unlimited songs
1998 songs
Songs written by Jean-Paul De Coster
Songs written by Phil Wilde
Songs written by Peter Bauwens
Byte Records singles